Lairdsville may refer to:

Lairdsville, New York
Lairdsville, Pennsylvania